The 2022–23 ENPPI SC season is the club's 38th season in existence and the 21st consecutive season in the top flight of Egyptian football. In addition to the domestic league, ENPPI will participate in this season's editions of the Egypt Cup and the EFA Cup.

Overview 
On 17 September, it was announced that coach Jorvan Vieira would not continue in his position after ENPPI finished ninth last season. Ahmed Abdel Moneim (Koshary) was names as the successor.

Players

First-team squad

Transfers

In

Out

Pre-season and friendlies

Competitions

Overview

Egyptian Premier League

League table

Results summary

Results by round

Matches 
The league fixtures were announced on 9 October 2022.

Egypt Cup

EFA Cup

References

ENPPI SC
ENPPI
2022 in African football
2023 in African football